Izboishchi is a rural locality (a village) and the administrative center of Izboishchskoye Rural Settlement, Chagodoshchensky District, Vologda Oblast, Russia. The population was 263 as of 2002. There are 5 streets.

Geography 
Trukhino is the nearest rural locality.

References 

Rural localities in Chagodoshchensky District